Casting JonBenet is a 2017 documentary film about the death of JonBenét Ramsey and the large impact it left behind. The film was directed by Kitty Green.

Synopsis
Casting JonBenet documents the casting process for the re-enactments in the documentary. Various Colorado-area actors are interviewed and tested for the roles of real people involved in the case, including John and Patsy Ramsey, Burke Ramsey, John Mark Karr and Boulder police officials. During the process, the would-be actors, dressed as the individuals they are auditioning for, reveal their emotions about the case and offer their own speculations. Rather than documenting the crime, the film observes how the events have become a point of pop-cultural obsession and conspiracy.

Release
The film premiered in January at the Sundance Film Festival. Netflix gained the rights to distribute Casting JonBenet, and began streaming it on April 28, 2017.

Reception
Casting JonBenet received positive reviews upon release. On review aggregator website Rotten Tomatoes, the film holds an approval rating of 81%, based on 47 reviews, and an average rating of 7.3/10. The website's critical consensus reads, "Casting JonBenéts unorthodox approach to its genre sets it apart in a crowded field, making for a uniquely thought-provoking true crime documentary hybrid." On Metacritic, it holds a rating of 74 out of 100, based on 14 reviews, indicating "generally favorable reviews".

References

External links
 
 
 
 

2017 films
2017 documentary films
American documentary films
Documentary films about psychology
Documentary films about crime in the United States
Documentary films about families
Films produced by James Schamus
Killing of JonBenét Ramsey
Netflix original documentary films
2010s English-language films
2010s American films